Kardea Brown is an American chef and caterer known for being the host of the television show Delicious Miss Brown on the Food Network. The show has reached  3.5 million viewers since its 2019 premiere, averaging over 1 million viewers per episode, and began its sixth season in 2022.

Early life 
Brown was born in Charleston, South Carolina and is of Gullah descent; her grandmother is from Wadmalaw Island. She is a contemporary Southern cook.

Career 
She had been working in social services and auditioned for a pilot on the Food Network but was told to work on her cooking skills. She started the New Gullah Supper Club in 2015, a pop-up traveling supper club featuring traditional Gullah dishes "with a contemporary twist" at events often featuring Gullah singers or storytellers. She was invited by Food Network to be on Beat Bobby Flay and to host Cupcake Championship before being offered her own show. Brown signed an exclusive contract with Food Network in 2021 which included her being the host of The Great Soul Food Cook-Off.

Delicious Miss Brown is set at a home on Edisto Island and focuses on "fresh, seasonal, and very seafood heavy" cooking. Brown's great-great-great grandmother was the last person to own Hutchinson House on Edisto Island. She hosted an episode with a fish-fry fundraiser to raise money for the house's restoration in 2021. During that show she discussed the history of slavery and the formerly enslaved people who built Hutchinson House, despite the network's past concerns about discussing similar topics on the network, according to food historian Dan Kohler.

Her first cookbook The Way Home was published in October 2022.

References

External links
 Official website

Living people
Gullah
American chefs
21st-century African-American women
Year of birth missing (living people)